Gisbert VI of Bronckhorst-Borculo ( – 1 November 1409) was a Dutch nobleman.  He was a son of William IV of Bronckhorst and Kunigunde of Moers.  He was the ruling Lord of Bronckhorst from 1399 until his death, and the ruling Lord of Borculo from 1402 until his death.  He was the sixth Lord of Bronckhorst name Gisbert, but only the second who also ruled Borculo, which is why some authors call him Gisbert II of Bronckhorst-Borculo.

Lordship of Borculo 
Gisbert was the second Lord of Borculo from the House of Brinckhorst.  He inherited the heerlijkheid in 1402 from his paternal uncle Gisbert I of Bronckhorst-Borculo.  In 1406, he saw himself forced to acknowledge the Bishop of Münster as the liege lord of Borculo and Lichtenvoorde.  Later Lords of Bronckhorst-Borculo also acknowledged the Bishops of Münster as their liege lord.

Marriage and issue 
Gisbert married Hedwig, the daughter of Count Otto VI, Count of Tecklenburg and Adelaide of Lippe.  They had three sons together:
 William (b. 1390)
 Otto (1392 – 23 February 1458), 3rd Lord of Bronckhorst and Borculo
 Frederick, died unmarried in 1405
 Kunigunda van Bronckhorst married Jan II van Montfoort about 1422 and had at least one son (Hendrick IV)

14th-century births
Year of birth unknown
1409 deaths
Medieval Dutch nobility
14th-century people of the Holy Roman Empire